När det känns att det håller på ta slut is a 2012 novel by Swedish writer Stig Larsson.

References

2012 Swedish novels
Swedish-language novels
Novels set in Stockholm
Albert Bonniers Förlag books